Chlorosterrha is a genus of moths in the family Geometridae from Africa. The genus was erected by Louis Beethoven Prout in 1912. The species of this genus are known from Angola and South Africa.

Species
Chlorosterrha dichroma (Felder & Rogenhofer, 1875)
Chlorosterrha monochroma L. B. Prout, 1912
Chlorosterrha semialba (Swinhoe, 1906)

References

Geometrinae